David Schroeder or Schröder may refer to:

David Schroeder (American football) (born 1937), American football coach
David Schröder (born 1985), German slalom canoer
David E. Schroeder, president of Pillar College